Yong-joon, also spelled Yong-jun, is a Korean masculine given name. There are 24 hanja with the reading "yong" and 34 hanja with the reading "joon" on the South Korean government's official list of hanja which may be used in given names. Additionally, names written with the character for "dragon" may be spelled as Ryong-jun or Ryong-joon, particularly in North Korea.

People with this name include:
Ahn Yong-joon (born 1987), South Korean actor
Bae Yong-joon (born 1972), South Korean actor 
Jeong Yong-joon (born 1976), stage name Jang Hyuk, South Korean actor
Kim Yong-joon (voice actor) (fl. 1990s), South Korean voice actor
Kim Yong-jun (singer) (born 1984), South Korean singer
Kwon Ryong-jun, coach of the North Korea national football team

See also
List of Korean given names
Kim Yong-jun (footballer) (born 1983), North Korean footballer, whose name is spelled differently (김영준) in Hangul

References

Korean masculine given names